Elafos is a village and a community of the Katerini municipality. Before the 2011 local government reform it was part of the municipality of Elafina, of which it was a municipal district. The 2011 census recorded 499 inhabitants in the village. The community of Elafos covers an area of 10.699 km2.

Population
According to the 2011 census, the population of the settlement of Elafos was 219 people, a decrease of almost 15% compared with the population of the previous census of 2001.

See also
 List of settlements in the Pieria regional unit

References

Populated places in Pieria (regional unit)